Frédéric and Frédérick are the French versions of the common male given name Frederick. They may refer to:

In artistry:

 Frédéric Back, Canadian award-winning animator
 Frédéric Bartholdi, French sculptor
 Frédéric Bazille, Impressionist painter best known for his depiction of figures
 Frédéric Mariotti, actor

In politics:

 Frédéric Bamvuginyumvira, 1st Vice-President of Burundi
 Frédéric Ngenzebuhoro, Vice-President of Burundi from 11 November 2004 to 26 August 2005
 Frédéric Bastiat, political economist and member of the French assembly

In literature:

 Frédéric Beigbeder, French writer, commentator critic and pundit
 Frédéric Berat, French poet and songwriter
 Frédéric Mistral, French poet

In science:

 Frédéric Cailliaud, French mineralogist
 Frédéric Joliot-Curie, French physicist and Nobel laureate

In sport:

 Frédéric Bourdillon (born 1991), French-Israeli basketball player in the Israel Basketball Premier League
 Frédérick Bousquet (born 1981), French swimmer
 Frédéric Dagée, French shot putter
 Frédéric Delcourt, French swimmer
 Frédéric Demontfaucon, French judoka
 Frédéric Havas, French volleyball player 
 Frédéric Herpoel, Belgian footballer
 Frédéric Kanouté, French-Malian footballer
 Frédéric Kuhn (born 1968), French hammer thrower
 Frédéric Michalak, French rugby union player
 Frédéric Piquionne, French footballer
 Frédéric Serrat, French boxer

In music:

 Frédéric Chopin, Polish composer
 Frédéric Leclercq, the bassist for extreme power metal band DragonForce

In other fields:

 Frédéric Dumas, one of the first two diving companions of Jacques-Yves Cousteau
 Frédérick Lemaître (born Antoine Louis Prosper Lemaître), French actor and playwright
 Frédéric Lepied, French computer engineer
 Frédéric Monod, French Protestant pastor
 Frédéric Nérac (born 1960), French journalist missing since 2003
 Frédéric Ozanam, French scholar
 Frédéric Passy, French economist
 Frédérick Raynal, French videogame designer and programmer
 Frédéric Rossif, French film and television director

See also:

 Federico
 Fred (disambiguation)
 Freddie (disambiguation)
 Freddo
 Freddy (disambiguation)
 Frederic (given name)
 Frederick (given name)
 Frederico
 Fredrik
 Fredro
 Friedrich (disambiguation)
 Fryderyk (disambiguation)

French masculine given names